Moyer is an unincorporated community in Fayette County, Pennsylvania, United States.

References

Unincorporated communities in Fayette County, Pennsylvania
Unincorporated communities in Pennsylvania